E. Duke Vincent (born Edward Ventimiglia on April 30, 1932, in Jersey City, New Jersey, United States) is an American television producer. He is a former producing partner of Aaron Spelling and an executive at various Spelling production company entities. Vincent, a 1960–61 naval aviator who was a member of the famed Blue Angels flying team, had a 40-year career in television writing and production, involving 2300 hours of television.

Television series in which Vincent participated include Dynasty; Charmed; Melrose Place; Beverly Hills, 90210; 7th Heaven; Wanted; Vega$; Matt Houston; Charlie's Angels; The San Pedro Beach Bums; Sunset Beach; Savannah and many others. Since 2006, Vincent primarily was engaged in writing novels, which often involved the entertainment industry. His first novel, Mafia Summer, is a fictionalization of factual organized crime.

Vincent was educated at Seton Hall University, from which he received a B.A. in 1954. He currently resides in Montecito, California, with his wife, actress Pamela Hensley.

Filmography 
 The San Pedro Beach Bums (1977)
 Vega$ (1978–1981)
 Dynasty (1981–1989)
 Matt Houston (1982–1985)
 Hotel (1983–1988)
 Life with Lucy (1986)
 2000 Malibu Road (1992)
 Melrose Place (1992–1999)
 Winnetka Road (1994)
 Burke's Law (1994–1995)
 Models Inc. (1994–1995)
 Robin's Hoods (1994–1995)
 Madman of the People (1994–1995)
 University Hospital (1995)
 Beverly Hills, 90210 (1995–2000)
 Malibu Shores (1996)
 Savannah (1996–1997)
 7th Heaven (1996–2006)
 Sunset Beach (1997–1999)
 Charmed (1998–2006)
 Safe Harbor (1999)
 Titans (2000–2001)
 Kingpin (2003)
 Clubhouse (2004–2005)
 Summerland (2004–2005)
 Wanted (2005)

Novels 
 Mafia Summer. Bloomsbury USA, 2006. 
 Black Widow. Bloomsbury USA, 2007.  
 The Strip. Bloomsbury USA, 2008. 
 The Camelot Conspiracy: A Novel of the Kennedys, Castro and the CIA

References

External links 

An interview with E. Duke Vincent, June 2011
Vincent quotations Retrieved 2010-03-04

1932 births
Seton Hall University alumni
Television producers from California
Living people
Businesspeople from Jersey City, New Jersey
People from Montecito, California
Television producers from New Jersey